James Edward Fauntleroy II (born May 16, 1984) is an American singer, songwriter, and record producer from Inglewood, California. He is best known for writing credits on tracks by high-profile artists such as Travis Scott, Frank Ocean, Kendrick Lamar, SZA, Drake, J. Cole, Vince Staples, Big Sean, Jay-Z, and John Mayer as well as writing songs for artists including Bruno Mars, Chris Brown, Beyoncé, Rihanna, and Justin Timberlake. In 2014 and 2018, Fauntleroy won the Grammy Award for Best R&B Song.

Musical career

In 2007, Fauntleroy wrote five tracks from Chris Brown's second album Exclusive (2007).

In 2009, James Fauntleroy co-wrote six tracks from Rihanna's fourth album Rated R (2009).

In 2011, Fauntleroy provided vocals for five songs on Common's The Dreamer/The Believer album. He appeared on "Dreamer (feat. Maya Angelou)", "Gold," "Cloth", "Celebrate", and "Windows". In 2012, he contributed vocals to Kanye West's first G.O.O.D. Music collaborative album, Cruel Summer. He appears on "Clique", "Higher", "Sin City", and "The One".

In 2013, Fauntleroy also made high-profile appearances on Drake's "Girls Love Beyonce", Nipsey Hussle's Crenshaw, Travis Scott's Owl Pharaoh, J. Cole's Born Sinner and Big Sean's Hall of Fame. He also contributed writing and additional vocals to New Kids on the Block's 10 (2013) and Jay-Z's Magna Carta Holy Grail (2013). Fauntleroy also performed at the 2013 Soul Train Music Awards. On November 15, 2013, Timbaland released "Know Bout Me", the first single from his album Textbook Timbo featuring Fauntleroy, Drake and Jay-Z. However, Timbaland looks to have shelved the project for the time being, instead focusing on his new album Opera Noir. He also co-wrote every song on Justin Timberlake's The 20/20 Experience (2013) and twelve further tracks on the follow-up The 20/20 Experience – 2 of 2 (2013).

In 2014, Fauntleroy won the Grammy Award for Best R&B Song for co-writing "Pusher Love Girl", for Justin Timberlake's highly successful third studio album The 20/20 Experience (2013).

In 2015, Fauntleroy wrote on 4 tracks on Rihanna's eighth studio album Anti and appeared on Kendrick Lamar's album To Pimp a Butterfly, which was nominated for Album of the Year at the 58th Annual Grammy Awards.

In 2016, Fauntleroy co-wrote 7 tracks on Bruno Mars' third studio album 24K Magic.

Discography

Awards
The Grammy Awards are awarded annually by the National Academy of Recording Arts and Sciences of the United States for outstanding achievements in the music industry. Considered the highest music honor, the awards were established in 1958. James Fauntleroy has won 4 awards out of 6 nominations.

|-
||2014
|"Pusher Love Girl" (As a songwriter)
|Best R&B Song
|
|-
||2015
|BEYONCÉ (featured artist)
|rowspan=2|Album of the Year
|
|-
||2016
|To Pimp a Butterfly (featured artist)
|
|-
|rowspan="3"|2018
|rowspan="2"|"That's What I Like" (As a songwriter)
|Song of the Year
|
|-
|Best R&B Song
|
|-
|"24K Magic" (As a songwriter)
|Album of the Year
|
|-

References

External links
 
 
 Check The Credits: Songwriter James Fauntleroy II On Writing Hits For Rihanna, Jordin Sparks, Justin Timberlake & More Life + Times
 SoundCloud
 BBC

1984 births
Living people
Roc Nation artists
American hip hop singers
African-American male  singer-songwriters
Singer-songwriters from California
African-American record producers
Record producers from California
American rhythm and blues singer-songwriters
21st-century African-American male singers
American male pop singers
Cocaine 80s members
Psychedelic artists